Imagon may refer to:

Rodenstock Imagon, a soft-focus lens by Rodenstock also known as Tiefenbildner
Imagon (drug), a trade name for the Chloroquine drug

See also
Imago (disambiguation)
Imacon